The photosphere is a star's outer shell from which light is radiated.

The term itself is derived from Ancient Greek roots, φῶς, φωτός/phos, photos meaning "light" and σφαῖρα/sphaira meaning "sphere", in reference to it being a spherical surface that is perceived to emit light.

A photosphere is the deepest region of a luminous object, usually a star, that is transparent to photons of certain wavelengths.

Temperature 

The surface of a star is defined to have a temperature given by the effective temperature in the Stefan–Boltzmann law. Stars, except neutron stars, have no solid or liquid surface. Therefore, the photosphere is typically used to describe the Sun's or another star's visual surface.

Composition of the Sun 
The Sun is composed primarily of the chemical elements hydrogen and helium; they account for 74.9% and 23.8%, respectively, of the mass of the Sun in the photosphere. All heavier elements, called metals in astronomy, account for less than 2% of the mass, with oxygen (roughly 1% of the Sun's mass), carbon (0.3%), neon (0.2%), and iron (0.2%) being the most abundant.

Sun 

Other stars may have hotter or cooler photospheres. The Sun's photosphere is around 100 kilometers thick.

Photospheric phenomena 

Each granule has a lifespan of only about twenty minutes, resulting in a continually shifting "boiling" pattern. Other magnetically-related phenomena in the Sun's photosphere include sunspots and solar faculae dispersed between granules. These features are too fine to be directly observed on other stars; however, sunspots have been indirectly observed, in which case they are referred to as starspots.

Notes

References

External links 

 Animated explanation of the Photosphere  (University of South Wales).
 Animated explanation of the temperature of the Photosphere (University of South Wales).
 Solar Lower Atmosphere and Magnetism (MPS)

Stellar astronomy
Sun
Light sources